Biskupin is an archaeological site and a life-size model of a late Bronze Age fortified settlement in north-central Poland that also serves as an archaeological open-air museum. When first discovered it was thought to be early evidence of a West Slavic settlement, but archaeologists later confirmed it belonged to the Biskupin group of the Lusatian culture from the 8th century BC. The excavation and the reconstruction of the prehistoric settlement has played an instrumental part in Polish historical consciousness.

It is a division of the National Museum of Archaeology in Warsaw.

The site is one of Poland's official national Historic Monuments (Pomnik historii), as designated September 16, 1994, and tracked by the National Heritage Board of Poland.

History of the excavations
In 1933 Polish archaeologists discovered remains of a Bronze Age fort/settlement in Wielkopolska (Greater Poland) and the discovery became famous overnight. The site was excavated from 1934 onwards by the team from Poznań University, led by archaeologists Józef Kostrzewski (1885–1969) and Zdzisław Rajewski (1907–1974). The first report was published in 1936. By the beginning of 1939, ca.  had been excavated. Biskupin soon became famous, attracting numerous distinguished guests, including officials of the Marshal Piłsudski government, members of the military, and high churchmen such as the primate of Poland. The site soon became part of Polish national consciousness, the symbol of achievements of the Slavonic forebears in prehistoric times. It was called the "Polish Pompeii" or "Polish Herculaneum". The existence of a prehistoric fortress,  from the German border, was used to show that the prehistoric "Poles" had held their own against foreign invaders and plunderers as early as the late Bronze Age. Biskupin came to feature in paintings and popular novels.

When the Germans occupied Poland in the autumn of 1939, Biskupin was renamed "Urstädt". In 1940, excavations were resumed by the SS-Ahnenerbe until 1942. When the Germans were forced to retreat they flooded the site hoping to destroy it, but—ironically—it led to very good preservation of the ancient timbers. Excavations were resumed by Polish archaeologists after the war and continued until 1974.

The site

There are two settlement periods at Biskupin, which was located in the middle of a lake but is now situated on a peninsula, that follow each other without a break. They consisted of two chambers and an open entrance-area. These houses were designed to accommodate 10–12 persons. An open hearth was located in the centre of the biggest room. There are no larger houses that could indicate social stratification. Because of the damp, boggy ground the streets were covered with wooden planks.

The settlement was surrounded by a tall wooden wall, or palisade, set on a rampart made up of both wood and earth. The rampart was constructed of oak trunks that form boxes filled with earth.

Dating

The settlement at Biskupin belongs to the Hallstatt C and D periods (late Bronze Age/early Iron Age, 800–650 BC and 650–475 BC). There are four radiocarbon dates from Biskupin (all B.C.):
 First settlement: 720±150 (Gif 494)
 Later settlement: 560±150 (Gif 495)
 Rampart: 620 ±150 (Gif 492)
 A2 4C, VII: 620±150 (Gif 493)

However, dendrochronological analysis provided more accurate dating. It proved that oak wood used in the construction of the settlement was cut down between 747–722 B.C. Over half of the wood used was cut during the winter of 748/747 B.C.

The model

In 1936 the first life-size model (open-air museum) was built on the peninsula, but it was intentionally destroyed by retreating Germans near the end of World War II. After the war it was rebuilt, and the ramparts and one full street with houses on both sides were also added.

In the 2000s, a film prop "medieval" timber castle was constructed on a part of the original site.

Bibliography

 Danuta Piotrowska, Biskupin 1933–1996: archaeology, politics and nationalism. Archaeologia Polona 35–36, 1997/98, 255–285, ISSN 0066-5924
 Józef Kostrzewski "Osada bagienna w Biskupinie w pow. żnińskim", Poznań 1936
 "Gród prasłowiański w Biskupinie", Poznań 1938,
 Z. Rajewski "Biskupin – osiedle obronne sprzed 2500 lat", Arkady, Warszawa 1970,
 Z. Rajewski "Osadnictwo ludności z kulturą łużycką we wczesnym okresie epoki żelaznej w Biskupinie i okolicy" Archeologia Polski, t. II 1958,
 Z. Rajewski "10 000 lat Biskupina i jego okolic", Warszawa 1965,

See also 

 Castles in Poland
 Archeology
 Bronze Age
 Kuyavian-Pomeranian Voivodship
 Lusatian culture
 Pałuki
 Wenecja
 Żnin
 Gąsawa

References

External links 

The official website of the Biskupin Archaeological Museum
Biskupin archeological site on Google Maps
 Hypothetical reconstruction of a Lusatian culture settlement, raised using only bronze age tools – Wola Radziszowska (near Cracow)- Poland
 Biskupin

Prehistoric sites in Poland
Archaeological sites in Poland
Archaeology of Poland
Prehistoric Poland
Landmarks in Poland
Open-air museums in Poland
Former populated places in Poland
Żnin County
Museums in Kuyavian-Pomeranian Voivodeship